Zachary Brooke may refer to:
Zachary Brooke (theologian) (1716–1788), English clergyman and academic
Zachary Brooke (historian) (1883–1946), British medieval historian and writer